Rykellus is a genus of mites in the family Ologamasidae. There are at least three described species in Rykellus.

Species
These three species belong to the genus Rykellus:
 Rykellus brevipellitus Karg & Schorlemmer, 2009
 Rykellus darglensis (Ryke, 1962)
 Rykellus nkandhlaensis (Ryke, 1962)

References

Ologamasidae
Articles created by Qbugbot